Archbishop of Adelaide may refer to:

Anglican Archbishop of Adelaide
Roman Catholic Archbishop of Adelaide